Joanna of Durazzo (1344 – 20 July 1387) was the eldest daughter and eldest surviving child of Charles, Duke of Durazzo, and his wife, Maria of Calabria. She succeeded as duchess on the death of her father in 1348 when she was only a child of four years old. Joanna was a member of the House of Anjou-Durazzo.

She reigned as Duchess of Durazzo from 1348-1368. She married twice; firstly to Louis of Navarre and then to Robert IV of Artois, Count of Eu.

Life 
Joanna's father died in 1348 and Joanna succeeded him, being the eldest surviving child. However, Joanna remained in Naples rather than going to Durazzo. It was here she was betrothed to her cousin Charles Martel, son of Queen Joan. Charles Martel was heir in Hungary due to a lack of male heirs. The boy was moved to Hungary, however the engagement was broken when the young boy died around 1348 in Hungary.

In 1365 aged twenty one, Joanna married her first husband Louis of Navarre, who became Duke of Durazzo in right of his wife. He was the son of Joan II of Navarre. In 1368 Durazzo was captured by the Albanian Topia dynasty under the leadership of warlord Karl Thopia. Joanna and her husband immediately began planning the reconquest of not only Durazzo, but all the lands of the former Angevin Kingdom of Albania, conquered by the Bulgarian Sratsimir dynasty in 1332. They were successful in rallying the support of Louis' brother Charles II the Bad and Charles V King of France in this undertaking. In 1372, Louis brought over the Navarrese Company of mercenaries, who had fought with him during the war in France, to assist them in taking Durazzo. Their ranks swelled considerably in 1375 with new recruits directly from Navarre. Many documents survive telling us of the complex nature of the military planning and engineering which was undertaken to ensure success. This they attained, taking the city in midsummer 1376. Louis died shortly after. Louis and Joanna had no children. Joanna never fully regained full control of Durazzo and by 1385 the City was back in the hands of Karl Thopia.

Around 1376 Joanna remarried to Robert IV of Artois, Count of Eu. This marriage was also childless. Robert was not Count of Eu for long, he and Joanna were not informed of his father's death in 1387. Joanna and Robert were staying at Castel dell'Ovo in Naples where they were both poisoned on July 20, 1387 on the orders of Joanna's sister Margaret, queen dowager and regent of Naples.

Joanna is buried in San Lorenzo (Naples).

References 

1344 births
1387 deaths
Dukes of Durazzo
House of Anjou-Durazzo
14th-century women rulers
14th-century Italian women